Online charging system (OCS) is a system allowing a communications service provider to charge their customers, in real time, based on service usage.

Architecture

Event based charging 
An event-based charging function (EBCF) is used to charge events based on their occurrence rather than their duration or volume used in the event. Typical events are SMS, MMS, purchase of content (application, game, music, video on demand, etc.).

Event-based charging function is used when the CC-Request-Type AVP = 4 i.e. for event request ex: diameter-sms or diameter-.....

Let us consider one example of Event-based charging.
1. Cost of one apple is Rupees 25/-
You pay the amount, take the apple and go. Similarly, if you send a text message it may cost you Rupee 1/- and that's it. You subscribe to Caller Ring Back Tone (CRBT) which costs you Rs.30/- a month irrespective of the number of calls you receive in a month.
So we can term event-based charging as a one-time cost or one-time occurrence cost.

Session based charging 

The session based charging function (SBCF) is responsible for online charging of network / user sessions, e.g. voice calls, IP CAN bearers, IP CAN session or IMS sessions.

Let us consider an example for session-based charging.
Utility services like electricity or water is charged based on overall usage, for a certain time duration.
You consume 'x' units of power in a month and pay for units consumed in that month. The usage may vary month to month and hence the charges. Similarly for consuming water, etc.
Hence, charging based on how much one consumes is termed as metered charging or session-based charging.

Account and balance management 
The account balance management function (ABMF) is the location of the subscriber’s account balance within the OCS.

See also 
 Diameter Credit-Control Application (DCCA)

References

 3GPP Telecommunication management; Charging management; Online Charging System (OCS): Applications and interfaces 3GPP 32.296
 3GPP Telecommunication management; Charging management; Charging architecture and principles 3GPP 32.240
 Open Mobile Alliance (OMA) Charging V1.0 OMA Charging V1.0

Telephony
Mobile telecommunications standards
3GPP standards
3rd Generation Partnership Project 2 standards
Telecommunications infrastructure
Mobile technology